Ben Taub (born January 9, 1991) is an American journalist who is a staff writer for The New Yorker magazine. He has written for the magazine about a range of subjects related to jihadism, crime, conflict, and human rights, mostly in Africa, Europe, and the Middle East.

Life
Taub attended Princeton University as an undergraduate student and graduated with an A.B. in philosophy in 2014. In 2012, during a year off from Princeton, he was a contestant on The Voice, on CeeLo Green's team. Six months later, he used the stipend from appearing on the show to fund his first trip to Kilis and the Turkish-Syrian border, to learn how to be a war correspondent. Taub's work in Kilis culminated in his 149-page long senior thesis, titled "Fools and Philosophy on the Fringe of War", completed under the supervision of Gideon Rosen.

In 2015, he graduated from the Columbia Graduate School of Journalism.

Awards
In 2017, Taub's work on war crimes in Syria, which was supported by the Pulitzer Center on Crisis Reporting and published by The New Yorker in both English and Arabic, was short-listed for a National Magazine Award and won the Livingston Award for International Reporting, the Robert F. Kennedy Journalism Award for International Print reporting, and the Overseas Press Club Award for Investigative Reporting. Taub also received the American Society of Magazine Editors Next Award for Journalists Under 30, and was named one of the Forbes 30 Under 30 in Media.

In 2018, his work on a convergence of crises in the Sahel won the George Polk Award for Magazine Reporting and the Prince Albert II of Monaco and United Nations Correspondents Association Global Prize for coverage of Climate Change.

In 2019, his work on Iraq's post-ISIS campaign of revenge, which was supported by the Pulitzer Center on Crisis Reporting, won the National Magazine Award for Reporting and the George Polk Award for Magazine Reporting, making him the eighth back-to-back Polk laureate, and the first in 20 years.

In 2020, Taub won the Pulitzer Prize for Feature Writing for the 2019 article "Guantanamo's Darkest Secret," about Mohamedou Ould Salahi, who was held at Guantanamo Bay without charge from 2002 to 2016.

Bibliography

 
 
 
 
———————
Notes

References

External links 

1991 births
21st-century American journalists
Living people
American investigative journalists
Columbia University Graduate School of Journalism alumni
Livingston Award winners for International Reporting
Princeton University alumni
Pulitzer Prize for Feature Writing winners
The New Yorker staff writers
The Voice (franchise) contestants